Gorkhon is a rural locality (a settlement) in Zaigrayevsky District, Republic of Buryatia, Russia. The population was 1,463 as of 2010. There are 16 streets.

Geography 
Gorkhon is located 58 km southeast of Zaigrayevo (the district's administrative centre) by road. Lesozavodskoy is the nearest rural locality.

References 

Rural localities in Zaigrayevsky District